Thyrgis militta is a moth of the subfamily Arctiinae. It was described by Caspar Stoll in 1781. It is found in Bolivia, Suriname, Venezuela and Peru.

References

External links

Arctiinae
Moths described in 1781